Veterinary Corps may refer to:
Australian Army Veterinary Corps, part of the Australian Army
Royal Army Veterinary Corps, part of the British Army
Royal Canadian Army Veterinary Corps, part of the Canadian Army
Indian Army Remount and Veterinary Corps, part of the Indian Army
Swedish Army Veterinary Corps, part of the Swedish Army
United States Army Veterinary Corps, part of the Army Medical Department (United States)